Baader is a surname of German origin.

People with the surname Baader
 Andreas Baader (1943–1977), militant of the Red Army Faction (Rote Armee Fraktion), also known as the Baader Meinhoff Gang
 Caspar Baader (born 1953), Swiss politician
 Franz Xaver von Baader (1765–1841), German philosopher and theologian
 Johannes Baader (1875–1955), architect, writer and artist associated with Dada
 Joseph von Baader (1763–1835), German railway pioneer
 Louis-Marie Baader (1828–1920), French painter
 Ottilie Baader (1847–1925), German women's right activist and socialist

See also 
 Baade (surname)
 Bader
 Badr (disambiguation)

German-language surnames
Occupational surnames